Anatoliy Yosypovych Kos-Anatolsky (1 December 1909 – 30 November 1983) was a Soviet and Ukrainian composer. People's Artist of the Ukrainian SSR (1969) and winner of Shevchenko National Prize (1980). Deputy of Supreme Soviet of the Soviet Union in 1970–1978 years.

Biography 
He was born on 1 December 1909 in Kolomyia (now Ivano-Frankivsk region) in the family of the famous Galician doctor Yosyf Kos.

While studying at Stanislav Gymnasium, he created a choir and began recording songs. In 1931 he graduated from the Faculty of Law of Lviv University, and in 1934 from the Lviv Conservatory. In the 1930s, together with Bohdan Vesolovsky, he was a member of "Jablonsky Jazz Chapel" ("Yabtso-Jazz"), later popular in the Lviv region. In 1934 – 1937 he taught at the Stryi branch of the Mykola Lysenko Higher Music Institute. From 1938 to 1939 he worked as a lawyer in the town of Zaliztsi.

The first independent creative work was the music for performances of the Lviv Music and Drama Theater (1941). During the war he was in Western Ukraine. From 1939 he worked as an accompanist of the Lviv House of Pioneers, a teacher at a music school. After the Second World War he became a member and since 1951 chairman of the Lviv regional branch of the Union of Soviet Composers of Ukraine, worked as concertmaster of the Lviv Drama Theater, and from 1952 – a teacher at the Lviv Conservatory (since 1973 – professor).

Died on 30 November 1983 in Lviv. His grave could be found in Lychakiv Cemetery (field No. 3) in Lviv. The tombstone was created by sculptor Emmanouil Galatsis.

Legacy
Anatoliy Kos-Anatolsky is the author of an opera, three ballets, symphonic works, a number of concerts and popular choirs, solo songs, romances. A lot of his works are influenced by Lemkos folklore.

Selected works
opera
 To Meet the Sun («Назустріч сонцю», 1957, 2nd edition – 1959)
ballets
 The Shawl of Dovbush («Хустка Довбуша», 1950),
 The Jay's Wing «(Сойчине крило», 1956),
 Orysia («Орися», 1964, 2-а ред. 1967);
operetta
  Spring Storms («Весняні грози», 1960);
cantatas 
 It Passed a Long Time Ago (1961) 
 The Immortal Testament (1963); 
oratorio 
 From the Niagara to the Dnieper («Від Ніагари до Дніпра», 1969); 
instrumental
two piano concertos
two violin concertos
selected choirs
Nova Verkhovyna, 
On the Carpathian Mountains
selected songs
Oh you, girl, from the grain nut («Ой ти, дівчино, з горіха зерня», after Ivan Franko, 1956), 
 Oh, I'll go to the mountain («Ой піду я межи гори», own words, 1958), 
 Two streams from Black Mountains («Два потоки з Чорногори», after Petrenko)
 White roses («Білі троянди»)
 Starry night («Зоряна ніч»)

References

Further reading 
Volyns’kyi, I. (1965). Анатолій Йосипович Кос-Анатольський [Anatolii Iosypovych Kos-Anatolskii]. Kyiv
Kolodii, Ia.; Poliek, V. (1974) Композитор Кос-Анатольський. [Composer Anatolii Kos-Anatolskii]. Lviv 
Tereshchenko А. (1986) Анатолій Кос-Анатольський [Anatolii Kos-Anatolskii]. Кyiv.

External links
Kos-Anatolsky, Encyclopedia of Ukraine
Tereshchenko А. Анатолій Йосипович Кос-Анатольський [Anatolii Iosypovych Kos-Anatolskii] In Ukrainian music encyclopedia, pp.558-559

1909 births
1983 deaths
20th-century composers
People from Kolomyia
Lviv Conservatory alumni
University of Lviv alumni
Eighth convocation members of the Supreme Soviet of the Soviet Union
Ninth convocation members of the Supreme Soviet of the Soviet Union
Recipients of the title of People's Artists of Ukraine
Stalin Prize winners
Recipients of the Order of Friendship of Peoples
Recipients of the Order of Lenin
Recipients of the Order of the Red Banner of Labour
Recipients of the Shevchenko National Prize
Ballet composers
Soviet male classical composers
Soviet music educators
Ukrainian classical composers
Ukrainian music educators
Burials at Lychakiv Cemetery